The City of Gold Coast is the local government area spanning the Gold Coast, Queensland, Australia and surrounding areas. With a population of 606,774 it is the second most populous local government area in Australia (City of Brisbane being the largest). Its council maintains a staff of over 2,500. It was established in 1948, but has existed in its present form since 2008. It is on the border with New South Wales with the Tweed Shire to the south in New South Wales.

History

Early history

By the late 1870s, the Government of Queensland had become preoccupied with the idea of getting local residents to pay through rates for local services, which had become a massive cost to the colony and were undermaintained in many areas. The McIlwraith government initiated the Divisional Boards Act 1879 which created a system of elected divisional boards covering most of Queensland. It was assented by the Governor on 2 October 1879, and on 11 November 1879, the Governor gazetted a list of 74 divisions which would come into existence. Four of these — Nerang, Coomera, Beenleigh and Waterford — were in the Gold Coast region. Southport was developed as both an administrative centre as well as a holiday destination with hotels and guesthouses to cater for visitors. Town dwellers had different needs to the rural landholders so Southport ratepayers lobbied the colonial government to create a separate Divisional Board so that rates monies raised by Southport landholders could be spent on town improvements. This resulted in the establishment of the Southport Division on 14 July 1883 by an amalgamation of part of Nerang Division and part of Coomera Division.

On 31 March 1903, following the enactment of the Local Authorities Act 1902, the divisions became shires. On 12 June 1914, the Town of Coolangatta was created from part of the Shire of Nerang, and on 12 April 1918, Southport became a town.

Development and growth

On 9 December 1948, as part of a major reorganisation of local government in South East Queensland, an Order in Council created the Town of South Coast by amalgamating Town of Southport, Town of Coolangatta and coastal sections (around Burleigh Heads) of the Shire of Nerang, creating a narrow coastal strip. The same Order abolished all of the earlier Shires and amalgamated most of their area into the new Shire of Albert, with the rest becoming part of the Shire of Beaudesert. The Order came into effect on 10 June 1949, when the first elections were held for the new councils.

On 23 October 1958, the Town of the South Coast adopted the name of Town of Gold Coast, and on 16 May 1959, the Town was proclaimed as the City of Gold Coast by the Governor of Queensland, having met the requirements for city status. Most of what is now regarded as the Gold Coast urban area was at that time located within the Shire of Albert, which had its administrative offices in Nerang-Southport Road, Nerang.

A regional authority
On 19 March 1992, the Electoral and Administrative Review Commission, created two years earlier, produced its report External Boundaries of Local Authorities, and recommended a number of changes to local government boundaries and the amalgamation of some local governments. Although their recommendations only included boundary adjustments between the Gold Coast City and Albert Shire, the outcome following much public debate was a decision by the Queensland Government to absorb Albert Shire into Gold Coast City.  The Local Government (Albert, Beaudesert and Gold Coast) Regulation 1994 was gazetted on 16 December 1994, resulting in the amalgamation of the Shire of Albert into Gold Coast City at the 1995 local government elections.

In 2007, as part of a report recommending massive amalgamation of local government in Queensland, the Local Government Reform Commission recommended that the Beenleigh-Eagleby region on the Gold Coast's northern border be transferred to Logan City, on the basis that a common community of interest existed and that planning of the South East Queensland urban footprint would be made more efficient by the change. The change took effect at 15 March 2008 local government elections.

Heritage listings

The Gold Coast has many heritage-listed sites, including those at:
 Currumbin
 Main Beach
 Pimpama
 Numinbah Valley
 South Stradbroke Island
 Southport
 Springbrook
 Surfers Paradise
 Tallebudgera
 Willow Vale

Suburbs and localities

Elected representatives
Gold Coast City has been divided into 14 divisions, each electing one councillor at elections held every four years. The present mayor is Cr Tom Tate who was first elected on 28 April 2012 and re-elected on both 19 March 2016 and 28 March 2020 with more than two thirds of the preferential vote.

The City of Gold Coast has a number of state electorates with the following people elected to the Queensland Legislative Assembly:

The City of Gold Coast has a number of federal electorates with the following people elected in the Australian House of Representatives:

Australian Senators are elected on a state-wide basis so none are specifically associated with the City of Gold Coast.

Population

Populations are provided below for the Gold Coast (Southport/Coolangatta, South Coast, Gold Coast) and Albert entities. As Albert included the entire Logan City area prior to 1978, figures are only provided from the 1976 census.

Demographics

Libraries

The first municipal library on the Gold Coast opened in the Southport Town Hall on 30 April 1958. Prior to this, a series of School of arts and private circulating libraries had supported the communities' and visitors' recreational and educational reading needs.

The City of Gold Coast has 12 libraries at Broadbeach (at Mermaid Waters), Burleigh Heads, Burleigh Waters, Coolangatta, Elanora, Helensvale, Nerang, Palm Beach, Robina, Runaway Bay, Southport and Upper Coomera. There is a special needs library within Nerang Library and a Local Studies Library (on the first floor of Southport Library). The council also operate a mobile library service.

In 2018, the mobile library provides a fortnight service to Alberton, Ashmore, Benowa, Bonogin, Cedar Creek, Coomera, Currumbin Valley, Gilston, Jacobs Well, Mudgeeraba, Ormeau (4 visits), Paradise Point, Pimpama (3 visits), Tugun, Steiglitz, Tallebudgera Valley, and Woongoolba. The Gold Coast City Library is a member of the Queensland Public Libraries Association.

Key projects

 Gold Coast University Hospital
 Tugun Desalination Plant
 Raising of Hinze Dam
 Southport Broadwater Parklands
 Gold Coast Rapid Transit System
 Gold Coast Ferry Service
 Gold Coast Regional Botanic Gardens
 Evandale Cultural Precinct including the Home of The Arts cultural centre and a greenbridge from Evandale Parklands to Chevron Island
 Mermaid Waters Library
 Gold Coast Shoreline Management Plan

Notable personnel
Notable people who work for or who have worked for the City of Gold Coast include:
 Guillermo Capati PSM, 1994–2017, managed the city's water and wastewater needs, long-term water planning and recycled water. Capati was awarded a Public Service Medal (PSM) during the 2013 Australia Day Honours for outstanding public service to the sustainable water future of the Gold Coast and broader South East Queensland region.

International relations
The City of Gold Coast has relationships with the following cities:

Sister City Agreements

 Beihai, China
 Da Nang, Vietnam (Friendship agreement)
 Zhuhai, China
 Tainan, Taiwan
 Taipei, Taiwan
 Dubai, United Arab Emirates
 Fort Lauderdale, Florida, United States
 Takasu, Japan
 Nouméa, New Caledonia
 Netanya, Israel
 Chengdu, China
 Kanagawa Prefecture, Japan (Friendship Agreement)

Other Partnerships

 Jining
 Wuhan
 Makassar
 Phuket Province, Thailand

See also

 Gold Coast Art Centre
 Gold Coast City Art Gallery
 List of Gold Coast suburbs

References

External links
 City of Gold Coast
 History of Gold Coast Council
 Gold Coast Internet Exchange - OOL-IX

Gold Coast
1948 establishments in Australia
City of Gold Coast